Tetraethyltin or tetraethyl tin is a chemical compound with the formula , that is, a tin atom attached to four ethyl groups. It is an important example of an organotin compound, often abbreviated as TET.

Tetraethyltin is a colourless flammable liquid, soluble in diethyl ether and insoluble in water, that freezes at −112 °C and boils at 181 °C. It is used in the electronics industry.

Tetraethyltin can be obtained by reacting ethylmagnesium bromide with tin(IV) chloride:

The same reaction can be used to obtain tetra-n-propyltin and tetra-n-butyltin.

Tetraethyltin is converted in the body to the more toxic triethyltin.

See also
 Tetraethylmethane
 Tetraethylsilane
 Tetraethylgermane
 Tetraethylplumbane

References

Coordination complexes
Organotin compounds
Foul-smelling chemicals
Tin(IV) compounds